Con la Banda...El Recodo (English With the band...El Recodo) is the twenty-fourth studio album by Mexican singer Juan Gabriel, released on December 8, 1998. Mexican Banda Sinaloense group Banda El Recodo provided the music for the album.

Track listing

Sales and certifications

References

External links 
Juan Gabriel official myspace site
 Con la Banda...El Recodo on amazon.com
[] Con la Banda...El Recodo on allmusic.com

1998 albums
Juan Gabriel albums
RCA Records albums
Spanish-language albums
Banda el Recodo albums